Kokumbo (also spelled Kokoumba) is a town in central Ivory Coast. It is a sub-prefecture and commune of Toumodi Department in Bélier Region, Lacs District.

In 2014, the population of the sub-prefecture of Kokumbo was 24,650.

Villages
The 19 villages of the sub-prefecture of Kokumbo and their population in 2014 are:

References

Sub-prefectures of Bélier
Communes of Bélier